Maple Avenue Historic District is a national historic district located at Hannibal, Marion County, Missouri.   The district encompasses 148 contributing buildings in a predominantly residential section of Hannibal. It developed between about 1850 and 1950, and includes representative examples of Federal, Italianate, Late Victorian, Colonial Revival, and Bungalow / American Craftsman architecture. Located in the district are the separately listed Ebert-Dulany House, Rockcliffe Mansion, and Eighth and Center Streets Baptist Church. Other notable buildings include Central School by William B. Ittner, Pilgrim Congregational Church, McKnight House, Cliffside, Hogg House, the McVeigh House, the Mclntyre House, the Settles House, and the Clayton House.

It was listed on the National Register of Historic Places in 2002.

References

Historic districts on the National Register of Historic Places in Missouri
Colonial Revival architecture in Missouri
Federal architecture in Missouri
Italianate architecture in Missouri
Victorian architecture in Missouri
Bungalow architecture in Missouri
Buildings and structures in Marion County, Missouri
National Register of Historic Places in Marion County, Missouri